Mohd Ikhmil Fawedz Mohd Hanif (born 21 November 1974) is a Malaysian solo long-distance swimmer, from Gombak, Selangor. Aged 42, he broke the Malaysian record for longest open water swim, previously held by Dato Abdul Malik Mydin.

Ikhmil Fawedz has made this significant attempt on 2 and 3 May 2015 in Sabah, from Kuala Penyu to Tanjung Aru and successfully completing the journey in 24 hours and 30 minutes. His late father Hj Mohd Hanif Hj Ismail  hailed from jalan Raja Alang, Kampung Baru, Kuala Lumpur and his late mother Hjh Zahrah Abd Ghani  hailed from jalan Mustaffa, Batu Pahat, Johor.

Athletic career 

Mohd Ikhmil Fawedz Mohd Hanif has learned on how to swim since at a tender age, but has stopped for 30 years until he advanced his career path in Labuan in oil & gas and shipping industry. Ever since he began his arduous journey to engrave his record-breaking attempt in Malaysia book of records.

Currently, Ikhmil Fawedz is still undergoing his intense training under his own endeavor. Swimming from St. Kilda to Geelong is one of his preparation to World Record Breaking attempt which covers more than 230 km. Rigorous, meticulous training and plan which is uncompromised and mandatory to materialise this agenda with merit. Most likely this will take place in Europe.  Killing two birds with one stone, per se he is also aiming for a slot in  10KM Marathon swim at Olympic Tokyo 2020.

65.34 km swim 

Ikhmil Fawedz announced his intention to swim across Kuala Penyu to Tanjung Aru on July 25, 2014, initially setting a target of 24 hours swim for 60 km in December 2014. Due to limited resources financially, he trained by himself and received his fitness and swim coaching and advise from his closed coach friends and Guru.

This swim was delayed due to weather, and unforeseen technical hitches and was finally organised on May 2, 2015 and acknowledged by the authorities and Malaysia Book of Records. 
During preparations, Ikhmil Fawedz originally intended to start from Wilayah Persekutuan Labuan as its gimmick, but was admonished by the organizer committee to start from Kuala Penyu, Sabah instead. Ikhmil Fawedz swam without cage, leaving Kuala Penyu at 9.00am, May 2, 2015, stroking at a consistent pace and stopping only to eat at 15 minutes intervals.

Ikhmil Fawedz reached Tanjung Aru beach in Kota Kinabalu, Sabah at 9.30am on the following day May 3, 2015, completing the swim in 24 hours and 30 minutes, for 65.34 km as recorded, exceeded his initial 24-hour target for 60 km.

Personal life

Present life 
Mohd Ikhmil Fawedz is a national record holder for the longest distance swim 65.34 km in 2015, a graduate of crown university and olympic solidarity of olympic council Malaysia and received his human resource degree and sports management. Currently he is working with a sports company, as head of human resources. He is still undergoing swim training with close monitoring by his personal physician Doctor Kanwal Gill as one of his preparations for competitions and in the near future he hopes he will be able to pursue his master's degree in human resource.

References 

1974 births
Living people
People from Selangor
Malaysian male long-distance swimmers
Malaysian people of Malay descent
Malaysian Muslims